beatmania IIDX 10th Style is the tenth game in the beatmania IIDX series of music video games. It was released in arcades by Konami in early 2004.

Gameplay

Beatmania IIDX tasks the player with performing songs through a controller consisting of seven key buttons and a scratchable turntable. Hitting the notes with strong timing increases the score and groove gauge bar, allowing the player to finish the stage. Failing to do so depletes the gauge until it is empty, abruptly ending the song.

The core gameplay remains the same in 10th Style. The previous flashing 7 difficulty level was replaced by a difficulty level of 8. In addition, an animated particle effect now occurs if a full combo is scored on a song. Also, now two players can set different modifiers.

e-Amusement

e-Amusement support was extended in 10th Style, now being able to sort songs in folders based on whether they have been cleared in various ways. These include Failed, Cleared, Easy Clear (for songs played with the Easy modifier), and Full Combo.

Songs

Home version
The home version was released in Japan on November 17, 2005 for the PlayStation 2. It contained previews from Happy Sky, along with several exclusive songs, including crossover tunes from other Bemani games like DDR Ultramix 3.

References

2004 video games
2005 video games
Arcade video games
Beatmania games
PlayStation 2 games
Japan-exclusive video games
Multiplayer and single-player video games
Video games developed in Japan
Video games scored by Kosuke Saito
Video games scored by Naoki Maeda
Video games scored by Ryutaro Nakahara
Video games scored by Takeo Miratsu